is a railway station in Hiu Town, Sasebo, Nagasaki Prefecture, Japan. It is operated by JR Kyushu and is on the Sasebo Line.

Lines
Besides the Sasebo Line local services, the JR Kyushu Rapid Seaside Liner also stops at the station. In addition, although  is the official starting point of the Ōmura Line, most of its local services run on to terminate at  using the Sasebo Line track.

Station layout
The station, which is unstaffed, consists of an island platform serving two tracks with a siding. A simple shelter is provided at the station as a waiting room. Another shelter is provided on the platform, together with an automatic ticket vending machine.

Adjacent stations

History
Japanese Government Railways (JGR) opened the station on 26 December 1910 as an additional station on the existing track of the Sasebo Line. With the privatization of Japanese National Railways (JNR), the successor of JGR, on 1 April 1987, control of the station passed to JR Kyushu.

Passenger statistics
In fiscal 2016, the station was used by an average of 403 passengers daily (boarding passengers only), and it ranked 269th  among the busiest stations of JR Kyushu.

Environs

Hiu Post Office
Sasebo City Office Hiu Branch
Japanet Takata
Sasebo-Minami High School
Sasebo National College of Technology

See also
 List of railway stations in Japan

References

External links

Hiu Station (JR Kyushu)

Railway stations in Nagasaki Prefecture
Railway stations in Japan opened in 1910
Sasebo Line
Sasebo